The Sector 16 Stadium is a cricket stadium in Chandigarh, India.

It hosted its first One Day International match in January 1985 and its only Test match in 1990.

It has hosted only four matches. The likes of Kapil Dev, Chetan Sharma and Yograj Singh started playing cricket at the Sector 16 Stadium. It fell out of favour to the nearby Punjab Cricket Association Stadium, (Mohali) cricket ground.

After the stadium in Mohali was built, there was no first-class cricket at the Sector 16 Stadium for 10 years before Haryana ended the barren spell by playing the Ranji Trophy Plate League semi-final in 2004/05. But after 14 years, India and Australia played a match in October 2007.

Records

Batting in One Day Internationals

 Most runs – Navjot Sidhu (India) – 180 runs in two matches, Geoff Marsh- 126 runs and Mathew Hayden- 92 runs.
 Highest score in an innings – Geoff Marsh (Australia) – 126*
Highest team score- India vs Australia- 291/4 on 8 Oct 2007.

Bowling in One Day Internationals

 Most wickets – Kapil Dev (India) – 4 wickets in three matches, T Sekhar- 3 wickets and V Raju- 3 wickets
 Best bowling in an innings – Thirumalai Sekhar (India) – 3 wickets for 23 runs

Batting in Test
 Most runs – Ravi Shastri (India) – 88 Runs in one match
 Highest score in an innings – Ravi Shastri (India) – 88
Highest team score- India vs Sri Lanka- 288 on 23 Nov 1990.

Bowling in Test
 Most wickets – Venkatapathy Raju (India) – 8 wickets in one match
 Best bowling in an innings – Venkatapathy Raju (India) – 6 wickets for 12 runs

List of Centuries

Key
 * denotes that the batsman was not out.
 Inns. denotes the number of the innings in the match.
 Balls denotes the number of balls faced in an innings.
 NR denotes that the number of balls was not recorded.
 Parentheses next to the player's score denotes his century number at Edgbaston.
 The column title Date refers to the date the match started.
 The column title Result refers to the player's team result

One Day Internationals

List of Five Wicket Hauls

Key

Tests

See also
 List of Test cricket grounds
 One-Test wonder
 Punjab Cricket Association Stadium
 Mullanpur International Cricket Stadium

References

External links
  Cricinfo Website – Ground Page
  cricketarchive Website – Ground Page

Test cricket grounds in India
Sports venues in Chandigarh
Cricket grounds in India
Sports venues completed in 1966
1966 establishments in Chandigarh
1987 Cricket World Cup stadiums
20th-century architecture in India